Élodie Chabrol is a science communicator and founder of the French Pint of Science festival.

Life 
Élodie Chabrol completed a thesis in neurosciences, at Paris-Descartes University. in 2009. She studied at University College London, on gene therapy against epilepsy, which led to a patent.

In 2017, she began freelance science communication. Her mission is to "make science accessible to everyone, everywhere."

Élodie Chabrol has advised on scientific communication and worked on the establishment of new events such as "On the Moon again", with the French National Centre for Scientific Research, and participated in the promotion of the Fête de la Science. She hosted the podcast, "Sous la blouse".

Works

References

External links 

 Official website

Living people
Year of birth missing (living people)
French neuroscientists